Lake Carnegie is a reservoir that is formed from a dam on the Millstone River, in the far northeastern corner of Princeton, Mercer County, New Jersey. The Delaware and Raritan Canal and its associated tow path are situated along the eastern shore of the lake. Noted businessman and philanthropist Andrew Carnegie donated money for the construction of the lake, which was donated to Princeton University. In 1990, the Lake Carnegie Historic District was listed on the National Register of Historic Places.

The lake, which is privately owned, is used by the university's rowing team, and is home to the US Olympic rowing team. It is, however, available for public use for activities such as ice skating, fishing, and picnicking. Fish species include largemouth bass, carp, pickerel, crappie, channel catfish and occasionally a few rainbow and brown trout that make their way into Carnegie Lake from Stony Brook. Years of pollution have led to a dangerous decrease in the lake's safety levels. Efforts to improve the water quality of Carnegie Lake are ongoing.

An aerial view of this lake appears in the opening title sequence of the drama series House M.D.

History

Prior to the construction of the lake, Princeton's varsity crew rowed on the narrow Delaware and Raritan Canal, sharing the busy waterway with commercial shipping. The team had discussed their desire to construct a lake in Princeton, but no plans were ever developed. In 1902, one of the team's former members (Howard Russell Butler, class of 1876) was asked to paint a portrait of noted philanthropist Andrew Carnegie.

While sitting for Butler, Carnegie discussed the many lochs he had built in his native Scotland. Butler relayed the plans he and his teammates had discussed previously to Carnegie, who took an immediate interest in the project. He asked Butler to investigate the potential cost and feasibility of constructing such a lake in Princeton. After working with a New York engineering company, Butler informed Carnegie that the estimated construction costs would be US$118,000.

Carnegie visited the university campus to view the construction site, and soon after authorized Butler to begin construction.  In 1903, a group of Princeton alumni began purchasing farmland that occupied areas of the projected basin. They, in turn, sold this land to Carnegie.  This was done in order to avoid arousing the suspicions of local residents, and to allow Carnegie to purchase the land for the lowest possible price. By 1905, the needed land was purchased and the work of clearing the area and constructing the bridges and dam began.

Carnegie attended the official opening ceremony on December 5, 1906, arriving by train with dozens of friends. He was met by a group including university president Woodrow Wilson. Carnegie and Wilson led an academic procession into Alexander Hall, where Carnegie was greeted enthusiastically by attending students (who had been given the day off). At one point, a group of students began to sing:

Carnegie returned to Princeton the following spring to attend the lake's first regatta. Wilson attempted to secure a second donation from Carnegie, who answered, "I have already given you a lake." Wilson's reported reply was, "We needed bread and you gave us cake."

Albert Einstein sailed often on Lake Carnegie during his years in Princeton which began in 1933.

Environmental problems
Due to its initially shallow depth, flooding and siltation (carried by Stony Brook) became problems for the area surrounding Carnegie Lake. Another problem was the rapid deposit of sewage carried by the Millstone River from nearby towns, where expansion of treatment facilities had not kept pace with rapid population growth. The lake has been dredged three times since its opening—first in 1927, in the late 1930s, and most recently in 1971. The 1971 dredging gave the lake a uniform depth of nine feet at a distance of 35 feet from the shoreline.

In its 2002 report on water quality, the United States Environmental Protection Agency rated Lake Carnegie as "impaired." This status indicates that the lake cannot support one or more of its designated uses. The sources of this nonpoint source pollution are varied—litter, chemicals (fertilizers and pesticides), automotive waste (oil and gas), and goose droppings have all contributed to the decline in water quality. Unsafe levels of mercury in the lake have led to an advisory on fish consumption.

A number of local volunteer groups have undertaken efforts to improve the quality of water in Lake Carnegie and surrounding waterways. These efforts include litter removal, water sample testing, and educational programs.

Gallery

References

External links
Video profile of the US Olympic rowing team's base in Princeton and on Lake Carnegie

Historic districts in Princeton, New Jersey
Bodies of water of Mercer County, New Jersey
Bodies of water of Middlesex County, New Jersey
Reservoirs in New Jersey
Princeton University
Rowing venues in the United States
National Register of Historic Places in Mercer County, New Jersey
National Register of Historic Places in Middlesex County, New Jersey
New Jersey Register of Historic Places

da:Carnegiesøen (Australien)